The 1973 National Soccer League season was the fiftieth season under the National Soccer League (NSL) name. The season began in May and concluded in late October with Toronto Hungaria defeating Toronto Croatia for the NSL Championship. Toronto Hungaria repeated their success by defeating Croatia for the NSL Cup, which marked the organization's first league double. Although Toronto Croatia was defeated in the postseason, they still managed to secure the regular-season title and qualified for the Canadian Open Cup. In the Canadian Open Cup final Toronto successfully defended the title for the third consecutive season by defeating Challenge Trophy finalists Toronto West Indies United. 

Toronto Croatia was scheduled to participate in the 1973 CONCACAF Champions' Cup against Club América, but the series of matches failed to materialize. Stanley Park Stadium was employed for the final time as the Toronto clubs transferred their home venue to the CNE Stadium in 1974. The league experienced a further increase in match attendance.

Overview  
The National Soccer League (NSL) was embroiled in a dispute with the Toronto Indoor Soccer League over the usage of players during the offseason. The NSL teams forbade their contracted players from participating in the indoor league without the consent of their clubs. Despite the ban, many NSL players ignored the decision and continued playing in the indoor league. The league increased in membership to 17 teams with the approval of additional teams in Toronto, and Montreal. The NSL expanded into Quebec with the return of Montreal Cantalia, and the Toronto representatives were Toronto Melita and Toronto Polonia. Melita previously competed in the Toronto & District Soccer League. 

Several teams were rebranded with Hamilton Apollos becoming Hamilton City, and Toronto Olympia was renamed, Toronto Homer. London City acquired the NSL franchise rights from London German Canadians, and Toronto Hellas had their franchise revoked. The league had an increase in match attendance with Serbian White Eagles, and Toronto Croatia averaging the most. The season also marked the final time the Toronto-based clubs would utilize Stanley Park Stadium as their home venue as the municipal government decided to convert the field into a park. The league administration addressed the continuing fan violence throughout the NSL with league president Joe Piccininni committing to placing stiffer fines the following season. The league table was modified after Ottawa Tigers were suspended in late August.

Teams

Coaching changes

Standings

Playoffs

Quarterfinals

Semifinals

Finals

Cup  
The cup tournament was a separate contest from the rest of the season in which all seventeen teams took part. The finals for the cup were to consist of a two-legged match but were scrapped after the first match was abandoned due to fan violence. The league decided to award the cup to Toronto Hungaria as they were leading the match before it was abandoned.

Finals

Canadian Open Cup  
The Canadian Open Cup was a tournament organized by the National Soccer League in 1971 where the NSL champion would face the Challenge Trophy winners to determine the best team throughout the country. The 1974 edition served as a qualifier match to determine the Canadian representative to the CONCACAF Champions' Cup. Toronto Croatia was the NSL representative for the third consecutive year while their opponents were the Toronto & District League champions Toronto West Indies United. The Vancouver Firefighters were the 1973 Challenge Trophy winners and originally were invited to participate, but declined which allowed the Challenge Trophy runner-ups Toronto West Indies United to compete for the title.

References

External links
RSSSF CNSL page
thecnsl.com - 1973 season

1973–74 domestic association football leagues
National Soccer League
1973